Amy Hughes (born 1992), also known as Amy V. Hughes, is a British-born New York City-based contemporary painter. She is best known for the portrait painting of her late grandfather and for her feminist take on the relationships between body and mind.

As of 2018, she teaches painting at the New York Academy of Art, a private graduate art school, and works out of her studio in Greenpoint, Brooklyn.

Hughes has been recognised for her efforts towards advancing the status of women artists and promoting equality.

Early life and education

Hughes was born in Leicester and was raised in Cheshire, United Kingdom and Moscow, Russia. At a young age her artistic abilities were identified and nurtured by her professors. At the age of sixteen, Hughes won the Cransley School Award for Art.

Hughes studied at Sir John Deane's College, followed by Liverpool Hope University where she earned a Bachelor's Degree in Fine Art. At her graduate show in 2013, she was awarded the “Purchase Prize Award” and her painting [Untitled, 2012] was purchased by the Liverpool Women's Hospital for their permanent collection. The painting currently hangs in the hospital’s main atrium.

In 2014, Hughes completed an artist residency at Sir John Deane’s College, where a painting of hers remains in private collection. Later that year she relocated to New York City to earn a Master of Fine Arts from the New York Academy of Art. Hughes graduated from the academy in 2016, her studies supported by awards including a New York Academy of Art Merit Scholarship and HRH Prince of Wales Award.

Exhibitions
Hughes' work has been exhibited in many solo and group shows internationally. Notably, her work has been exhibited at Paul Anavian Gallery at the Manhattan Arts & Antiques Center, and the International Portrait Biennial at Wausau Museum of Contemporary Art. She has exhibited and sold work twice at Sotheby’s "Take Home a Nude" art auction, alongside pieces by Eric Fischl, Yoko Ono, Kiki Smith, and Judy Chicago.

In 2016, Hughes created a painting for the Westminster Kennel Club which was exhibited at the Annual Dog Show at Madison Square Gardens and printed on the show tickets.

As of 2018, she has a drawing in the collection of fashion designer Misha Nonoo.

Awards

References

Living people
1992 births
21st-century British painters
Alumni of Liverpool Hope University
British conceptual artists
British contemporary painters
British women painters
People from Cheshire
People from Leicester
Women conceptual artists